High River is a town within the Calgary Metropolitan Region of Alberta, Canada. High River had a population of 14,324 in 2021.

History 

The community takes its name from the Highwood River, which flows through the town.
The area was originally inhabited largely by the Blackfoot First Nation, who called the site Ispitzee (or the "place of high trees along running water"). By 1870, after the arrival of the North-West Mounted Police and after Treaty Number 7 had been signed in 1877, settlers began arriving into the region. High River's development centered on a convenient location for people, horses and cattle to cross the Highwood River -  a location known as "The Crossing".

Development of the town was supported by the completion of the Calgary and Edmonton Railway in 1892. High River incorporated as a village on December 5, 1901, and was incorporated as a town on February 12, 1906. Future Senator and area rancher Daniel Edward Riley would serve as the Town of High River's first mayor.

Although growth slowed during the First World War, it continued after the war with the building of brick structures and a number of industries. One of Canada's first air force stations was constructed to the east of the town in 1921 The establishment of a British Commonwealth Air Training Plan elementary flying training school at the same air station helped boost High River's economy during the Second World War.

High River continued to grow throughout the 1950s and 1960s. In the 1970s the downtown saw some major redevelopment, and redevelopment is continuing.

Floods 

The Highwood River is subject to frequent flooding. Flood events of exceptional magnitude occurred in 1894, 1899, 1902, 1908, 1912, 1923, 1929, 1932, 1942, 1995, 2005 and 2013. Most recently during the 2013 Alberta floods, thousands of people in Alberta were ordered to evacuate their homes after the rise of the Highwood River, Bow River, Elbow River Sheep River, and numerous others. In 2013, three people died as a result of the flooding of the Highwood River.

Geography

Climate 
High River experiences a humid continental climate (Köppen climate classification Dfb). Summer days are mild to warm with cool nights, while winters are cold and snowy with annual snowfall averaging 69 inches (175 cm).

Demographics 

The population of the Town of High River according to its 2019 municipal census is 14,052, a  change from its 2010 municipal census population of 11,783.

In the 2016 Census of Population conducted by Statistics Canada, the Town of High River recorded a population of 13,584 living in 5,367 of its 5,655 total private dwellings, a  change from its 2011 population of 12,930.

In the 2021 Census of Population conducted by Statistics Canada, the Town of High River recorded a population of 14,324 living in 5,790 of its 5,790 total private dwellings, a 5.4% change from its 2016 population of 14,324.

Arts and culture 

As part of High River's tourism and heritage endeavours, a number of murals illustrating High River's history were painted around town. The first of which were painted in the 1990s, and the most recent one being completed in 2016.

Attractions 
The Museum of the Highwood (c. 1911–12), which sustained smoke, water and fire damage following a fire in the building's attic in July 2010, is on the Canadian Register of Historic Places.

Education 

High River is part of the Foothills School Division No. 38, as well as the Christ The Redeemer Catholic Schools Division.

Foothills School Division:

 École Joe Clark School – Grades K-5
 Spitzee Elementary School  – Grades K-5
 École Senator Riley Middle School – Grades 6–8
 École Secondaire Highwood High School – Grades 9–12

Christ The Redeemer Catholic Schools:

 Holy Spirit Academy – Grades K-6
 Notre Dame Collegiate – Grades 7–12

Media 
 CHRB AM 1140, community radio
 CFXO-FM 99.7, country music
 CKUV-FM 100.9, classic hits
 High River Times

Notable people 
Evan Berger, Member of the Legislative Assembly of Alberta, 2008 - 2012
George Canyon, country music singer
Joe Clark, former Canadian Prime Minister
John "Pie" McKenzie, former professional hockey player
W. O. Mitchell, author
Glen Sather, former hockey player/head coach
Danielle Smith, Premier Of Alberta

Film and television 
High River has been used as a filming location for the following films and television series:

Superman III (1983)
Caitlin's Way (20002002)
Heartland (2007present)
Fargo (2014present)
Tin Star (20172020)
Black Summer (20192021)
The Last of Us (2023present)

See also 
List of communities in Alberta
List of towns in Alberta
High River Airport
RCAF Station High River
Frank Lake

References

External links 

 
1901 establishments in the Northwest Territories
Towns in Alberta